Cafferty is a surname, and may refer to:

 Bernard Cafferty (born 1934), British Chess Master and Writer
 Jack Cafferty (born 1942), American CNN commentator
 John Cafferty (born 1950), American musician

Fictional characters
 'Big Ger' Cafferty, fictional character in novels by Scottish author Ian Rankin
Mitch Cafferty, Jericho character

Anglicised Irish-language surnames